Chelsea Holmes (born January 20, 1987) is an American cross-country skier who competes internationally.

She competed for U.S. at the FIS Nordic World Ski Championships 2017 in Lahti, Finland.

Cross-country skiing results
All results are sourced from the International Ski Federation (FIS).

World Championships

World Cup

Season standings

References

External links 
 

1987 births
Living people
American female cross-country skiers
21st-century American women